DF 05 Live (stylized as DF 05 LiVE) is the first live album and first overall album by American folk band Sonia & Disappear Fear. The album was released on October 18, 2005 by Sonia Rutstein's own Disappear Records label. The songs on the album span across Sonia's solo career as well as the earlier incarnation of her band, Disappear Fear.

Track listing

Personnel
Sonia & Disappear Fear
Laura Cerulli - percussionist, backing vocals
Angela L. Edge - bass, trumpet
Sonia Rutstein (SONiA) - lead vocals, guitar, piano, harmonica

References

Disappear Fear albums
2005 live albums
Live folk albums
Self-released albums